Daniel Zolnikov (born January 29, 1987) is an American politician who served as a member of the Montana House of Representatives from 2013 to 2021. He was elected to House District 47 which represents Billings, Montana.

Career 
Zolnikov is noted for pursuing pro-privacy legislation. He was chairman of the House Federal Relations, Energy and Telecommunications Committee. In June 2020, he was defeated in a race for a seat on the Montana Public Service Commission. In September 2020 he resigned to accept a position with a utility company. Subsequently, the Yellowstone County Commission appointed his wife Katie Zolnikov to replace him.

He has given talks at DEF CON and Young Americans for Liberty events.

References

External links
Official campaign website

Living people
Republican Party members of the Montana House of Representatives
University of Montana alumni
1987 births
People from Roundup, Montana
Politicians from Billings, Montana
American people of Russian descent
21st-century American politicians